This list of works by Álvaro Siza Vieira categorizes the Pritzker Prize winning architect's work.

 1958-1963: Boa Nova restaurant in Leça da Palmeira, Portugal. (Photos)
 1958-1965: Quinta de Conceição swimming-pool, Portugal. (Photos)
 1959-1973: Piscinas de Marés swimming-pool, Leça da Palmeira, Portugal.
 1962: Miranda Santos House, Portugal.
 1964: Beires House ("The Bomb House"), Póvoa de Varzim, Portugal. (Project)
 1977-1997: Malagueira Social Housing, Évora, Portugal.
 1980-1984: Bonjour Tristesse, Berlin, Germany.
 1981-1985: Avelino Duarte House Ovar, Portugal.
 1984-1994: Casa Vieira de Castro, Vila Nova de Famalicão, Portugal.
 1985: Campo di Marte Social Housing Project, Venice, Italy. 
 1985-1988: Housing Schilderswijk West, the Hague, Netherlands.
 1986-1993: Faculty of Architecture of the University of Porto, Portugal.
 1986: Borges&Irmão Bank, Vila do Conde, Portugal.
 1988: Rebuilding plans of the Chiado neighbourhood after a fire, Lisbon, Portugal.
 1988-1993: Galician Center of Contemporary Art, Santiago de Compostela, Spain.
 1990-1996: Church of Santa Maria, Marco de Canaveses, Portugal.
 1991-1999: Faculty of Journalism, University of Santiago, Santiago de Compostela, Spain.
 1991-2000: Residential buildings ("Siza tower"), Maastricht, Netherlands.
 1992: Barcelona's Meteorology Center, Barcelona, Spain.
 1992-2021: Headquarters of the Bank of Cape Verde, Praia, Cape Verde
 1994: Vitra (furniture) factory hall, Weil am Rhein, Germany.
 1995: Revigrés exhibition and sales hall at Águeda, Portugal.
 1995: Library of the University of Aveiro, Portugal.
1995-2000: School of Journalism, Santiago de Compostela, Spain
 1995-2009: Architecture Museum Insel Hombroich, Neuss, Germany.
 1997: Serralves Museum of Contemporary Art, Porto, Portugal. 
 1997: Rectory of the University of Alicante, Alicante, Spain. 
 1998: Architectural Practice, Porto, Portugal. (Photos)
 1998: Lisbon Metro Station Baixa Chiado, Portugal.
 1998: Pavilion of Portugal in Expo'98, Lisbon, Portugal.
 1998-2005: General University Hospital of Ciudad Real, Ciudad Real, Spain.
 2000: Pavilion of Portugal in Expo'00, Hannover, Germany.
 2002: Southern Municipal District Center, Rosario, Argentina.
 2005: Serpentine Gallery Pavilion 2005, London, United Kingdom.
 2005: Porto Metro Station Sao Bento, Porto, Portugal.
 2005: Llobregat Sports Center, Cornellà de Llobregat, Spain.
 2005: Donnaregina Modern Art Museum Naples, Italy
 2005: Tolo House Ribeira de Pena, Portugal
 2006: Home and Atelier of Armanda Passos, Porto, Portugal.
 2007: Adega Mayor wine seller, Campo Maior, Portugal.
 2007-2010: Mimesis Museum in Paju Book City, Seoul, South Korea.
 2008: Iberê Camargo Foundation, Porto Alegre, Brazil.
 2009: New Orleans residential tower, Rotterdam, Netherlands.
 2009-2019: University Hospital of Toledo, Toledo, Spain.
 2009-2021 Miljana Chapel, Hrvatsko Zagorje, Croatia.
 2011: Bizkaia Aretoa main hall of the University of the Basque Country, Bilbao, Spain.
 2011-2012: "Alvaro Siza. Viagem sem Programa" Art work collection of his sketches and drawings. Museum Fondazione Querini Stampalia, Venice, Italy
 2012: Novartis Campus Office Building, Basel, Switzerland. 
 2012: "Il Giardino delle Vergini" Pavilion Giardini della Biennale, Venice Biennale of Architecture, Italy.
 2014: Office building for the Shihlien Chemical Industrial Jiangsu Co, Jiangsu, China.
 2014: Siza House-Taifong Golf Club, Taiwan.
 2015: Auditorium Theatre of Llinars del Valles, Llinars del Vallès, Barcelona, Spain.
 2015-2017: Church of Saint-Jacques-de-la-Lande, France.
 2016: Museu Nadir Afonso, Chaves, Portugal.
 2017: Abade Pedrosa Museum, Santo Tirso, Portugal.
 2018: Saya Park Art Pavilion, Gyeongsangbuk-do, South Korea.
 2018: Capela do Monte, Bensafrim e Barão de São João, Portugal.
2019: Amore Pacific Campus, Yogin-sin, South Korea.
 2019: China Design Museum, Hangzhou, China.
 2019-2020: 611 West 56th Street Residential Tower Manhattan, New York city, United States of America.
 2020: Residential complex Gallarate, Varese,  Italy.
 2020: Huamao Museum of Art Education Yinzhou, China.
 2022: Jeju Island Tea House Jeju, South Korea.

References

Vieira, Alvaro Siza
Álvaro Siza Vieira buildings